Polecat is an unincorporated community in Humphreys County, Tennessee, United States.

Notes

Unincorporated communities in Humphreys County, Tennessee
Unincorporated communities in Tennessee